Lev Eduardovich Conus (Lev Eduárdovich Konyús), known in Western Europe and the US as Leon Conus (1871–1944), was a Russian pianist, music educator, and composer.  A brother of the composers Georgi Conus and Julius Conus, he studied together with Sergei Rachmaninoff in Anton Arensky's advanced composition class and served as chief professor of piano at the Moscow Conservatory until 1918.  Together with his wife, the pianist and pedagogue Olga Kovalevskaya Conus (1890-1976) they left the Soviet Union for Paris in 1921 where he subsequently taught at the city's Russian Conservatory, before finally moving to the United States in 1935.  He taught in Cincinnati until his death at the age of 73.  After his death, his wife published Fundamentals of Piano Technique, an influential book of Leon Conus's technical exercises for pianists.

Additional reading 
Tchaikovsky-Research.net

External links 

1871 births
1944 deaths
Russian classical pianists
Male classical pianists
Russian male classical composers
Pupils of Pavel Pabst
Pupils of Sergei Taneyev
Russian Romantic composers
Russian music educators
20th-century Russian male musicians
19th-century male musicians
19th-century musicians